Daniel Heenan (born 17 November 1981) is an Australian-born Japanese rugby union footballer. His usual position is at flanker/lock. He used to play for the Brumbies in the Super 14 and has played for the Wallabies. He plays for Panasonic Wild Knights in Japan.

Career

Heenan was born in Queensland and was educated at Marist College Ashgrove. Heenan was the captain of the Australian Schoolboys and went on to represent Australia at under-19 and under-21 level, as well as playing for Australia A.

He made his Super Rugby debut for the Queensland Reds in 2002 against the Sharks. Although he had some trouble with injury, which caused him to miss a number of games during his time at the Reds, Heenan made his debut for Australia in 2003 in a match against Wales.

Heenan signed with the Brumbies for the 2006 Super 14 season, leaving the Reds with 23 caps to his name. Following the 2006 Super 14 season, Heenan was named in John Connolly's Wallaby team to play England.

External links
Heenan signs with Brumbies
Heenan joins Brumbies

1981 births
Australian rugby union players
ACT Brumbies players
Queensland Reds players
Living people
Rugby union flankers
Rugby union locks
Expatriate rugby union players in Japan
Australia international rugby union players
Saitama Wild Knights players
Australian expatriate rugby union players
Australian expatriate sportspeople in Japan
Japanese rugby union players
Japan international rugby sevens players
Rugby union players from Queensland